Roberto Galli (born 26 April 1973) is an Italian gymnast. He finished in twenty-eighth place in the all around at the 1996 Summer Olympics.

References

External links
 

1973 births
Living people
Italian male artistic gymnasts
Olympic gymnasts of Italy
Gymnasts at the 1996 Summer Olympics
People from Gallarate
Sportspeople from the Province of Varese